Alessandro Lualdi J.C.D. S.T.D. (12 August 1858 – 12 November 1927) was an Italian Roman Catholic cardinal who served as Archbishop of Palermo.

Biography
Lualdi was born in Milan, Italy. He entered the Seminary of Milan and carried on further studies at the Theological Academy of Saint Thomas Aquinas in Rome where he earned doctorates in theology, philosophy and canon law. He was ordained in 1880. After his ordination, he worked in the Archdiocese of Milan doing pastoral work from 1884 until 1890. He later served as a faculty member of the Seminary of Milan until 1894. He was created Privy Chamberlain of His Holiness on 14 September 1899.

Episcopate
Pope Pius X appointed him Archbishop of Palermo on 14 November 1904. He was made Cardinal-Priest of Santi Andrea e Gregorio al Monte Celio in the consistory of 15 April 1907. He took part in the conclaves of 1914 that elected Pope Benedict XV and 1922 that elected Pope Pius XI. 

He died in 1927 and is buried in the metropolitan cathedral of Palermo. The following inscription marks his grave: ALEXANDRO PRESB. CARD. LVALDI HIC IN PACE CHRISTI QUIESCITALEXANDRO CAR. ARCHIEP. LVALDIQUI D. URBIS PATRONAEENIXE CULTUM PROVEXITPRUDENTIA CARITATE TH. DISCIPLINISPRAESTITITPANORMITANA DIOCESISAN. REP. SAL. MCXXXVII

References

1858 births
1927 deaths
Clergy from Milan
20th-century Italian cardinals
Roman Catholic archbishops of Palermo
20th-century Italian Roman Catholic archbishops
Cardinals created by Pope Pius X